Silvan is a town in Victoria, Australia, located 40 km east of Melbourne, located within the Shire of Yarra Ranges local government area. Silvan recorded a population of 1,323 at the 2021 census.

Silvan marks the halfway point between Belgrave and Lilydale, both large suburban areas. The area's soils, well suited to growing fruits, vegetables and flowers, draw tourists to the various pick-yourself orchards and berry farms in Silvan. A cultivated hybrid variety of blackberry known as the silvanberry is named after the town.

History
Originally known as Wandin Yallock South, the town was first surveyed in 1868. The town's name was changed to Silvan in 1913, the same year the local primary school changed its name to Silvan Primary School.

In 1917, and as a result of a growing population in Melbourne's south east, the Silvan Reservoir was commissioned, with the reservoir completed in 1932. A conduit from the Upper Yarra dam was completed in 1957. In 1954 the first Tulip Festival was held, becoming an annual tradition continuing to this day.

Culture

Events
The town's most prominent attraction is the annual Tulip Festival, held every spring during September & October. The festival attracts over 100,000 visitors every year, and its overall success has spawned a number of flower festivals held at other times of the year.

Sport
The town of Silvan is home to an Australian Rules football team, founded in 1921. The Football Club is affiliated with the [[Eastern Football Netball League](EFNL). The Club is known as the Silvan Football Club, (SFC),together with the monicker of the “Cats”. The Club has won an impressive 11 Senior Premierships.
1930, 1934, 1955, 1959 (All in MDFA), 
1992, 2002, 2004, 2007, 2008 (All in YVMDFL), 
2014, 2022 (EFNL). 
The past thirty years has been an especially successful period for the mighty Cats, qualifying for eight Grand-finals, and winning seven.
The Club also won one Reserve Grade Premiership in 1986 (YVMDFL), and one U19 Premiership in 2019 (EFNL).
Notable AFL players who’ve pulled on a Silvan guernsey include Essendon premiership great, and “Mark of the Century” taker, Gary Moorcroft, alongside fellow Bombers, Aaron Henneman, Marc Bullen, and Ben Haynes (who also played at Richmond). Players from other AFL clubs includes Robert Powell (Richmond/Stkilda), Ashley Matthews (Carlton/Fitzroy), Lindsay Gillbee (Footscray), Cyril Mann (Carlton). As well as champion Victorian Sheffield Shield and Australian Test Cricketer, Bryce Mcgain.
Alongside the football club, Silvan is home to a cricket club. Established in 1926, the club is known as the Silvan Cricket Club, with the unique nickname of the “Slugs”. Currently participating in the FTGDCA, and previously in the YVCA. The cricket club has won numerous premierships in many grades, over their near 100 year history, the most recent being in the 2019/20 season, a week before Covid restrictions began in March 2020.
 In the current 22/23 season, the Silvan Slugs have established their own connection with ex AFL players from the Essendon Football Club. Joshua Begley, Michael Hurley and Dylan Clarke have all graced the picturesque Silvan Recreation Reserve this season, unsurprisingly seeing the Slugs head into the Christmas break undefeated.

References

External links

Tesselaar Tulip Festival Silvan Australia

Towns in Victoria (Australia)
Yarra Ranges